Henry Hoyle Oddie (31 January 1815 – 21 May 1869) was an English lawyer and landowner, and a cricketer who played first-class cricket for Cambridge University between 1834 and 1836. He was born in London and died at Colney House, St Albans, in Hertfordshire.

Oddie was educated at Eton College and at Trinity College, Cambridge. He played as a batsman in seven first-class matches for the Cambridge side over three seasons; he batted in the middle and lower order, though not with any success in any position as his highest score was just 14 and he averaged just 5.57 with the bat. There is no record that he bowled in first-class cricket. In 1836, he played in the university match against Oxford University, scoring 9 and 3 and taking his only recorded catch.

Oddie graduated from Cambridge University with a Bachelor of Arts degree in 1837 and was admitted to the Middle Temple the same year. He was married with twelve children and a large staff of servants.He lived at Tilgate Manor, Worth,Sussex where he farmed a large leased estate until moving back to Colney House, Herts, on his father's death.The family's London residence was at 18 Carey Street (which was 18 and 20 knocked together) and also the place of business for their law practice.

References

1815 births
1869 deaths
English cricketers
Cambridge University cricketers
Alumni of Trinity College, Cambridge
Members of the Middle Temple
People educated at Eton College
People from St Albans (district)
People from Worth, West Sussex